The Self-Sacrifice National Democratic Party was a political party in Uzbekistan.

At the 2004–05 Uzbek parliamentary election, the party won 18 out of the 120 seats in the Legislative Chamber of Uzbekistan, the lower house of the Oliy Majlis. In 2007, the party merged with the Uzbekistan National Revival Democratic Party, as the two parties shared common goals. The new group retained the National Revival Democratic Party name.

See also 
 Politics of Uzbekistan

References

External links 
 Note from Center for Asia-Pacific Women in Politics 

2008 establishments in Uzbekistan
Defunct political parties in Uzbekistan
Political parties disestablished in 2008